Carlos "Boogie" Basham Jr. (born December 16, 1997) is an American football defensive end for the Buffalo Bills of the National Football League (NFL). He played college football at Wake Forest, and was drafted by the Bills in the second round of the 2021 NFL Draft.

Early years
Basham attended Northside in Roanoke, Virginia.  As a senior, he had 76 tackles and seven sacks. He committed to Wake Forest University to play college football.

College career
After redshirting his first year at Wake Forest in 2016, Basham played in all 13 games in 2017 and had 24 tackles. As a junior in 2018, he had 64 tackles and 4.5 sacks. Basham returned to Wake Forest as a starter in 2019. On December 21, 2019, Basham announced that he would resume his college stint for his senior season in 2020.

Professional career

Basham was selected by the Buffalo Bills in the second round (61st overall) of the 2021 NFL Draft. On May 12, 2021, Basham officially signed with the Bills.

On September 8, 2022, during the kickoff game at the Los Angeles Rams, Basham recorded his first ever career interception, a 21 yard pick from Matthew Stafford. This interception helped seal the game for the Bills as they won 31-10. Basham also recorded a sack on Stafford earlier in the night.

Personal life
Basham is the cousin of NFL defensive end Tarell Basham. He gained his nickname "Boogie" due to his fondness for dancing in his youth.

NFL career statistics

Regular season

Postseason

References

External links

Wake Forest Demon Deacons bio

1997 births
Living people
Sportspeople from Roanoke, Virginia
Players of American football from Virginia
American football defensive ends
Wake Forest Demon Deacons football players
Buffalo Bills players